{{DISPLAYTITLE:C12H15N2O3PS}}
The molecular formula C12H15N2O3PS (molar mass: 298.30 g/mol, exact mass: 298.0541 u) may refer to:

 Phoxim
 Quinalphos